Sundsbruk is a locality situated in Sundsvall Municipality, Västernorrland County, Sweden with 2,137 inhabitants in 2010.

Sports
The following sports clubs are located in Sundsbruk:

 Sund IF

References 

Populated places in Sundsvall Municipality
Medelpad